Madenli is a village in the District of Aladağ in the Adana Province, Turkey.

References

Villages in Aladağ District